The International Seapower Symposium (ISS) is a biennial meeting of the world's chiefs of navy that has met at the United States Naval War College since 1969. The proceedings of these symposia have been published on the Internet since ISS XVI in 2003.

History
With the objective of promoting mutual understanding among the several leaders of the world's maritime nations, the First International Seapower Symposium (ISS I) was convened at the Naval War College in Newport, Rhode Island on 17–20 November 1969. This four-day symposium was conceived by the President of the Naval War College, Vice Admiral Richard G. Colbert, U.S. Navy, who served as host for the ISS I. The Chief of Naval Operations, Admiral Thomas H. Moorer addressed the meeting. As a result of the success of this symposium, plans were made to continue these discussions as a biennial event. All International Seapower Symposia, since, have been conducted at the Naval War College, and hosted by the incumbent Chief of Naval Operations with only two exceptions. Early fall dates have been selected to take advantage of both the normally good weather and also the relaxed atmosphere in Newport.

References

External links
 International Seapower Symposium at the United States Naval War College

Navies
Naval War College
International military conferences
International conferences in the United States
Naval diplomacy
1969 establishments in Rhode Island
Recurring events established in 1969